Álava ( in Spanish) or Araba, officially Araba/Álava, is a province of Spain and a historical territory of the Basque Country, heir of the ancient Lordship of Álava, former medieval Catholic bishopric and now Latin titular see.

Its capital city, Vitoria-Gasteiz, is also the seat of the political main institutions of the Basque Autonomous Community. It borders the Basque provinces of Biscay and Gipuzkoa to the north, the community of La Rioja to the south, the province of Burgos (in the community of Castile and León) to the west and the community of Navarre to the east. The Enclave of Treviño, surrounded by Alavese territory, is however part of the province of Burgos, thus belonging to the autonomous community of Castile and León, not Álava.

It is the largest of the three provinces in the Basque Autonomous Community in geographical terms, with 2,963 km2, but also the least populated with 331,700 inhabitants (2019).

Etymology 
Built around the Roman mansion Alba located on the road ab Asturica Burdigalam (possibly the current village of Albéniz near Agurain), it has sometimes been argued the name may stem from that landmark. However, according to the Royal Academy of the Basque Language, the origin may be another: The name is first found on Muslim chronicles of the eighth century referring to the Alavese Plains (Spanish Llanada Alavesa, Basque Arabako Lautada), laua in old Basque (currently lautada) with the Arab article added (al + laua), developing into Spanish Álava and Basque Araba (a typical development of l to r between vowels).

Physical and human geography 

Álava is an inland territory and features a largely transitional climate between the humid, Atlantic neighbouring northern provinces and the dry and warmer lands south of the Ebro River. According to the relief and landscape characteristics, the territory is divided into five main zones: 
The Gorbea Foothills: Green hilly landscape.
The Valleys: Low valleys, drier, sparsely populated.
The Plains: Heartland of Álava comprising Vitoria and Salvatierra-Agurain, with a central urban area and crop landscape prevailing around and bounded south and north by the Basque Mountains.
The Alavese Mountains: High altitude and forested.
The Alavese Rioja: Oriented to the south on the left bank of the Ebro River, perfect for vineyards and part of the Rioja denominación de origen.
Ayala: The area clustering around the Nervión River, with Amurrio and Laudio as its major towns. The region shows close bonds with Bilbao and Biscaye and an industrial landscape.

Unlike Biscay and Gipuzkoa, but for Ayala and Aramaio, the waters of Álava pour into the Ebro and hence to the Mediterranean by means of two main waterways, i.e. the Zadorra (main axis of Álava) and Bayas Rivers. In addition, the Zadorra Reservoir System harvests a big quantity of waters that supply not only the capital city but other major Basque towns and cities too, like Bilbao.

While in 1950 agriculture and farming shaped the landscape of the territory (42.4% of the working force vs 30.5% in industry and construction), the trend shifted gradually during the 60s and 70s on the grounds of a growing industrial activity in the Alavese Plains (Llanada Alavesa), with the main focus lying on the industrial estates of Vitoria-Gasteiz (Gamarra, Betoño and Ali Gobeo) and, to a lesser extent, Salvatierra-Agurain and Araia. At the turn of the century, only 2% of the working Alavese people was in agriculture, while 60% was in the tertiary sector and 32% in manufacturing. Industry associated with iron and metal developed earlier in the Atlantic area much in tune with Bilbao's economic dynamics, with droves of people flocking to and clustering in Amurrio and Laudio, which have since become the third and second main towns of Álava.

Demography and rural landscape 

The vast majority of the population clusters in the capital city of Álava, Vitoria-Gasteiz, which also serves as the capital of the Autonomous Community, but the remainder of the territory is sparsely inhabited with population nuclei distributed into seven counties (kuadrillak or cuadrillas): Añana; Ayala/Aiara; Campezo/Kanpezu; Laguardia; Agurain/Salvatierra; Vitoria-Gasteiz; Zuia.

Population development
The historical population is given in the following chart:

History

Lordship of Álava

List of rulers (modern Spanish names) :
Eylo, up to 866
Rodrigo c. 867–870, count of Castile
Vela Jiménez 870–c. 887
Munio Velaz c. 887–c. 921
Álvaro Herraméliz c. 921–931, also count of Cerezo and Lantarón
Fernán González 931–970, also count of Castile, Álava feudatary of Castile until 1030
García Fernández 970–995
Munio González 1030–1043
Fortunio Íñiguez 1043–1046
Munio Muñoz (co-lord) 1046–1060, Álava feudatary of Navarre, 1046–1085
Sancho Maceratiz (co-lord) 1046–1060
Ramiro 1060–1075
Marcelo 1075–1085
Lope Íñiguez 1085–?, Álava feudatary of Castile until 1123
Lope Díaz the White ?–1093
Lope González 1093–1099
Lope Sánchez 1099–1114
Diego López I 1114–1123
Ladrón Íñiguez 1123–1158, Álava feudatary of Navarre until 1199
Vela Ladrón 1158–1175
Juan Velaz 1175–1181
Diego López II 1181–1187
Íñigo de Oriz 1187–1199
Diego López de Haro I 1199–1214, Álava feudatary of Castile until personal union of 1332
Lope Diaz de Haro I 1214–1240
Nuño González de Lara 1240–1252
Diego López de Haro II 1252–1274
Fernando de la Cerda 1274–1280
Lope Díaz II de Haro 1280–1288
Juan Alonso de Haro 1288–1310
Diego López de Salcedo 1310–1332

The title is attributed to the Castilian kings after 1332.

Ecclesiastical history

Bishopric 
The Arab invasion of the Ebro valley in the eighth century, many Christians of the Diocese of Calahorra sought refuge in areas further north free of Arab rule. The diocese called Álava or Armentaria was established in 870 on territory split off from the Diocese of Calahorra. From then until the 11th century the names of several bishops of this see are recorded, the best known being the last, Fortún, who in 1072 went to Rome to argue before Pope Alexander II in defence of the Mozarabic Rite, which King Alfonso VI of León and Castile had decreed should be replaced by the Roman Rite.

The see was suppressed in 1088, when it was merged into the Diocese of Najéra, another suffragan of the Metropolitan Archdiocese of Tarragona. 
The territory of the diocese of Álava, which corresponded more or less to that of the present diocese of Vitoria, was reabsorbed into that of Calahorra when Najéra was suppressed in 1170, when King Alfonso VIII of Castile conquered La Rioja.

Suffragan Bishops of Álava 
(all Roman Rite) 
(For a list, see Antonio Rivera, ed., Historia de Álava (2003), pp. 599–600.)

 Bivere or Aivere (before 871 – after 876)
 Álvaro (c. 881 – c. 888)
 Munio I (937/956 – 971)
 ? Julián (?–984)
 Munio II (984–989)
 García I (996 – c. 1021)
 Munio III (c. 1024 – c. 1030)
 García II (1037 – 1053/1055)
 Fortún [Fortuño] I (1054/1055)
 Vela (1056–1062)
 Munio IV (1062 – c. 1065)
 Fortún II (c. 1067 – 1088)

Titular see 
No longer a residential bishopric, Álava is today listed by the Catholic Church as a titular see since the diocese was nominally restored in 1969 as Titular bishopric of Álava.

It has had the following incumbents, so far of the fitting episcopal (lowest) rank:
 Stanisław Smolenski (1970/01/14 – death 2006/08/08) as Auxiliary Bishop of Kraków (Poland) (1970.01.14 – 1992.02.01) and on emeritate
 Mario Iceta Gavicagogeascoa (2008.02.05 – 2010.08.24) as Auxiliary Bishop of Bilbao (Basque Spain) (2008.02.05 – 2010.08.24); later succeeded Bishop of Bilbao (2010.08.24 – ...)
 Nelson Francelino Ferreira (2010.11.24 – 2014.02.12) as Auxiliary Bishop of São Sebastião do Rio de Janeiro (Brazil) (2010.11.24 – 2014.02.12); later Bishop of Valença (Brazil) (2014.02.12 – ...)
 Carlos Lema Garcia (2014.04.30 – ...), as Auxiliary Bishop of São Paulo (Brazil)

Spanish Civil War
At the start of the Spanish Civil War Álava and Vitoria were easily captured by the rebel Nationalists led by General Angel García Benítez, assisted by Colonel Camilo Alonso Vega. Vitoria was captured on 19 July 1936. In November 1936 an attempt by Republicans to retake Vitoria was thwarted after being spotted by Nationalist reconnaissance aircraft. The 1937 Nationalist campaign in Vizcaya was supported by 80 German aircraft based at Vitoria, where the Condor Legion fighter wing was concentrated.

See also 
 List of municipalities in Álava

Footnotes

Sources and external lists 
 GGatholic ecclesiastical history

 
Wine regions of Spain